The Adopted Son may refer to:

 The Adopted Son (1917 film), a 1917 American silent film directed by Charles Brabin
 An alternative name for Beshkempir, aka Beshkempir the Adopted Son, a 1998 Kyrgyz language film